WCNG (102.7 FM) is a radio station broadcasting a soft adult contemporary format. Licensed to Murphy, North Carolina, United States, the station is currently owned by Cherokee Broadcasting Co., Inc. and features programming from AP Radio.

The station is an affiliate of the Atlanta Braves radio network, the largest radio affiliate network in Major League Baseball.

References

External links

CNG
Soft adult contemporary radio stations in the United States